Edward Hogan (born 1980) is a British novelist.

He was educated at the University of East Anglia (MA Creative Writing, 2004). He won the 2009 Desmond Elliott Prize for his debut novel Blackmoor. Blackmoor was also shortlisted for the 2008 Dylan Thomas Prize. The Hunger Trace was shortlisted for the 2012 Encore Award. Daylight Saving was shortlisted for the 2013 Branford Boase Award.

Awards
2009 Desmond Elliott Prize, Blackmoor

Bibliography
 Blackmoor (2008)
 The Hunger Trace (2011)
 Daylight Saving (2012)
 The Messengers (2013)
 The Electric (2020)

References

1980 births
Living people
Alumni of the University of East Anglia
British writers
People from Derby
Recipients of Desmond Elliott Prize